Al Doty (born October 19, 1945) is a Minnesota politician and a former member of the Minnesota House of Representatives who represented District 12B, which includes portions of Crow Wing and Morrison counties.  A Democrat, he was first elected in 2006 when he defeated three-term Republican incumbent Greg Blaine. He was re-elected in 2008, but was unseated by Republican Mike LeMieur in the 2010 general election.

Biography
Doty taught social studies, coached wrestling, and was technology coordinator at Pierz High School in Pierz from 1968 until he retired in 1999. After retiring, he went to work as a senior citizen advocate for Horizon Health, Inc. in Pierz.

In 2004, Doty ran for the District 12B seat as an Independence Party candidate against Rep. Blaine and DFL-endorsed candidate Bob Keeton. Blaine won the election. In March 2006, he was asked by the DFL Party to run as their candidate after Bob Keeton dropped out. He won the election by 582 votes. In 2008, he was challenged by Little Falls city councilman Mike LeMieur. He was re-elected by a narrow margin of 76 votes. In 2012, Doty ran for the Minnesota Senate in the redrawn District 9 and was defeated by Paul Gazelka.

Doty served on the House Agriculture, Rural Economies and Veterans Affairs Committee and on that committee's subcommittee for Veterans Affairs. He was also a member of the Finance subcommittees for the Agriculture, Rural Economies and Veterans Affairs Finance Division, and the Environment and Natural Resources Finance Division.

Electoral history

 

Note: The ±% column reflects the change in total number of votes won by each party from the previous election.

References

External links

 Rep. Doty Web Page
 Rep. Doty Campaign Web Site

Living people
1945 births
People from Wilkin County, Minnesota
People from Pierz, Minnesota
University of Minnesota Morris alumni
Democratic Party members of the Minnesota House of Representatives
American Protestants
21st-century American politicians
People from Royalton, Minnesota